Bulbophyllum flabellum-veneris, often listed as B. lepidum is a species of orchid, in the subfamily Epidendroideae and the genus Bulbophyllum, with the common name: Venus' fan bulbophyllum. This orchid greatly resembles the Bulbophyllum pulchellum. Its flowers cluster in groups of 7 to 10 in a fan like structure. They are mainly red but taper to yellow at the edges. It is native to Hainan island, India, Indonesia, Myanmar, Malaysia, Thailand and Vietnam.

References

The Bulbophyllum-Checklist
The Internet Orchid Species Photo Encyclopedia

flabellum-veneris